The Esperanza mine is a large copper mine located in the central-northern of Chile in Coquimbo Region. Esperanza represents one of the largest copper reserve in Chile and in the world having estimated reserves of 1.61 billion tonnes of ore grading 0.39% copper.

In 2010, Severn Trent Services was asked to install a new Sea Water Reverse Osmosis plant with capacity to produce 2400 cubic meter of clean water per day.

References 

Copper mines in Chile
Mines in Coquimbo Region
Surface mines in Chile